Bhagalpur Assembly constituency is one of 243 constituencies of legislative assembly of Bihar. It is a part of Bhagalpur Lok Sabha constituency along with other assembly constituencies viz. Gopalpur, Pirpainti, Kahalgaon, Bihpur and Nathnagar. In 2015 Bihar Legislative Assembly election, Bhagalpur will be one of the 36 seats to have VVPAT enabled electronic voting machines.

Overview
Bhagalpur comprises Bhagalpur (Municipal Corporation) of Jagdishpur CD Block.

Members of Legislative Assembly

Election results

See also
 List of Assembly constituencies of Bihar

Sources
Bihar Assembly Election Results in 1951
Bihar Assembly Election Results in 1957
Bihar Assembly Election Results in 1962
Bihar Assembly Election Results in 1967
Bihar Assembly Election Results in 1969
Bihar Assembly Election Results in 1972
Bihar Assembly Election Results in 1977
Bihar Assembly Election Results in 1980
Bihar Assembly Election Results in 1985
Bihar Assembly Election Results in 1990
Bihar Assembly Election Results in 1995
Bihar Assembly Election Results in 2000
Bihar Assembly Election Results in 2005
Bihar Assembly Election Results in 2010

References

External links
 

Politics of Bhagalpur district
Assembly constituencies of Bihar